Darreh Jir (also Romanized as Darreh Jīr) is a village in Ahandan Rural District, in the Central District of Lahijan County, Gilan Province, Iran. At the 2006 census, its population was 215, in 71 families.

References 

Populated places in Lahijan County